The Dorris Motor Car Company was founded by George Preston Dorris in 1906. Born in Nashville, Tennessee, Dorris had built an experimental gasoline car circa 1896–1897 in his family's bicycle shop. He relocated to St. Louis, Missouri, where he joined with John L. French to found the St. Louis Motor Company. Dorris served as chief engineer.

When French relocated to Peoria, Illinois, in 1905, Dorris quit the firm and founded the Dorris Motor Car Company soon after. With his departure, French and the St. Louis Motor Carriage Company quickly foundered.

History

Dorris is credited with developing and patenting the float carburetor, an innovation that was used for decades. For much of the Dorris production life the slogan was "Built up to a standard, not down to a price."

Production vehicle
The company took over the original St. Louis Motor Company plant and began production there. The first vehicle had a four-cylinder engine with  wheel-base, which took the New York Automobile Show by storm in January 1906. The engines were of the OHV design, unusual at the time. The price tag of these cars was nearly $7,000.

In 1909, Guy Herring Hall Sr. and his brother, George Hall, drove a Dorris across Missouri, setting a record time of 33 hours.

Prior to World War I truck production began. In 1917, the capital stock expanded by $700,000 to $1,000,000, enabling expansion of the company. Company president, H.B. Krenning stepped aside "because of needed rest" and W.R. Colcord assumed his duties.

Astra acquisition

In 1920, Dorris acquired the Astra (1920 automobile), a competing St. Louis auto manufacturer, and re-organized as Dorris Motors Corporation.

In 1923 rumors abounded that the Dorris, Haynes and Winton companies would merge, but this merger did not come to fruition.

Company failure

1923 signalled the last full year of production for Dorris Motors. Production fell to a standstill, although the 'practically hand-built' Dorris cars were built to special order until 1926 when the company went bankrupt.

See also
1907 Dorris Motor Car Company Building
List of defunct United States automobile manufacturers

External links
Dorris - St. Louis Missouri (1906-1926)

References 

Brass Era vehicles
Defunct motor vehicle manufacturers of the United States
1900s cars
1910s cars
Vehicle manufacturing companies established in 1906
Vehicle manufacturing companies disestablished in 1911
Defunct manufacturing companies based in Missouri
American companies established in 1899
Vehicle manufacturing companies established in 1899
American companies established in 1906